Netsilik School in Taloyoak, Nunavut, Canada, serves a population of about 300 students from Kindergarten up to grade 12, as well as a preschool program funded by Aboriginal Headstart Canada which has approximately 40 students. The school was built in the 1970s and the current principal, Gina Pizzo, was named as one of Canada's outstanding principals in 2012. The preschool program, up to grade 3, provides Inuktitut immersion, and a 60/40% Inuktitut/English program in the higher grades.

References

Elementary schools in Nunavut
High schools in Nunavut
Kitikmeot Region
Educational institutions established in 1972